This is a list of stars arranged by their absolute magnitude – their intrinsic stellar luminosity. This cannot be observed directly, so instead must be calculated from the apparent magnitude (the brightness as seen from Earth), the distance to each star, and a correction for interstellar extinction. The entries in the list below are further corrected to provide the bolometric magnitude, i.e. integrated over all wavelengths; this relies upon measurements in multiple photometric filters and extrapolation of the stellar spectrum based on the stellar spectral type and/or effective temperature.

Entries give the bolometric luminosity in multiples of the luminosity of the Sun and the bolometric absolute magnitude. As with all magnitude systems in astronomy, the latter scale is logarithmic and inverted i.e. more negative numbers are more luminous.

Most stars on this list are not bright enough to be visible to the naked eye from Earth, because of their high distances, high extinction, or because they emit most of their light outside the visible range. For a list of the brightest stars seen from Earth, see the list of brightest stars.  There are three stars with over 1 million  and visible to the naked eye: WR 22, WR 24 and Eta Carinae.  All of these stars are located in the Carina nebula.

Measurement
Accurate measurement of stellar luminosities is difficult, even when the apparent magnitude is measured accurately, for four reasons:

The distance d to the star must be known, to convert apparent to absolute magnitude. Absolute magnitude is the apparent magnitude a star would have if it were 10 parsecs away from the viewer. Because apparent brightness decreases as the square of the distance (i.e. as 1/d2), a small error (e.g. 10%) in determining d implies an error ~2× as large (thus 20%) in luminosity. Stellar distances are only directly measured accurately out to d ~1,000 light years.
The observed magnitudes must be corrected for the absorption or extinction of intervening interstellar or circumstellar dust and gas. This correction can be enormous and difficult to determine precisely. For example, until accurate infrared observations became possible ~50 years ago, the Galactic Center of the Milky Way was totally obscured to visual observations.
The magnitudes at the wavelengths measured must be corrected for those not observed. "Absolute bolometric magnitude" (which term is redundant, practically speaking, since bolometric magnitudes are nearly always "absolute", i.e. corrected for distance) is a measure of the star's luminosity, summing over its emission at all wavelengths, and thus the total amount of energy radiated by a star every second. Bolometric magnitudes can only be estimated by correcting for unobserved portions of the spectrum that have to be modelled, which is always an issue, and often a large correction. The list is dominated by hot blue stars which produce the majority of their energy output in the ultraviolet, but these may not necessarily be the brightest stars at visual wavelengths.
A large proportion of stellar systems discovered with very high luminosity have later been found to be binary. Usually, this results in the total system luminosity being reduced and spread among several components. These binaries are common both because the conditions that produce high mass high luminosity stars also favour multiple star systems, but also because searches for highly luminous stars are inevitably biased towards detecting systems with multiple more normal stars combining to appear luminous.

Because of all these problems, other references may give very different values for the most luminous stars (different ordering or different stars altogether). Data on different stars can be of somewhat different reliability, depending on the attention one particular star has received as well as largely differing physical difficulties in analysis (see the Pistol Star for an example). The last stars in the list are familiar nearby stars put there for comparison, and not among the most luminous known. It may also interest the reader to know that the Sun is more luminous than approximately 95% of all known stars in the local neighbourhood (out to, say, a few hundred light years), due to enormous numbers of somewhat less massive stars that are cooler and often much less luminous. For perspective, the overall range of stellar luminosities runs from dwarfs less than 1/10,000th as luminous as the Sun to supergiants over 1,000,000 times more luminous.

Data

This list is currently limited mostly to objects in our galaxy and the Magellanic Clouds, but a few stars in other local group galaxies can now be examined in enough detail to determine the luminosities. Some suspected binaries in this magnitude range are excluded because there is insufficient information about the luminosity of the individual components. Selected fainter stars are also shown for comparison. Despite their extreme luminosity, many of these stars are nevertheless too distant to be observed with the naked eye. Stars that are at least sometimes visible to the unaided eye have their apparent magnitude (6.5 or brighter) highlighted in blue.
Thanks to gravitational lensing, stars that are strongly magnified can be seen at much larger distances. The first star in the list, Godzilla - an LBV in the distant Sunburst galaxy - is probably the brightest star ever observed although it is believed to be undergoing a temporary episode of increased luminosity that has lasted at least seven years, in a similar manner to the Great Eruption of Eta Carinae that was witnessed in the 19th century.

The first list show a few of the known stars with an estimated luminosity of 1 million L☉ or greater, including the stars in open cluster, OB association and H II region. The majority of stars thought to be more than 1 million L☉ are shown, but the list is incomplete.

The second list gives some notable stars for the purpose of comparison.

A few notable stars of luminosity less than 1 million  are kept here for the purpose of comparison.

Note that even the most luminous stars are much less luminous than the more luminous persistent extragalactic objects, such as quasars. For example, 3C 273 has an average apparent magnitude of 12.8 (when observing with a telescope), but an absolute magnitude of −26.7. If this object were 10 parsecs away from Earth it would appear nearly as bright in the sky as the Sun (apparent magnitude −26.744). This quasar's luminosity is, therefore, about 2 trillion (1012) times that of the Sun, or about 100 times that of the total light of average large galaxies like our Milky Way. (Note that quasars often vary somewhat in luminosity.)

In terms of gamma rays, a magnetar (type of neutron star) called SGR 1806−20, had an extreme burst reach Earth on 27 December 2004. It was the brightest event known to have impacted this planet from an origin outside the Solar System; if these gamma rays were visible, with an absolute magnitude of approximately −29, it would have been brighter than the Sun (as measured by the Swift spacecraft).

The gamma-ray burst GRB 971214 measured in 1998 was at the time thought to be the most energetic event in the observable universe, with the equivalent energy of several hundred supernovae. Later studies pointed out that the energy was probably the energy of one supernova which had been "beamed" towards Earth by the geometry of a relativistic jet.

See also

References

External links 
 The 150 Most Luminous Stars in the Hipparcos Catalogue
 The R136 Cluster
 The Magnitude system
 Tim Thompson's list of Brightest Star candidates

Lists of stars
Milky Way
Stars, most luminous
luminous stars